Peter Stead may refer to:
Peter Stead (architect) (1922–1999), English architect
Peter Stead (cricketer) (born 1930), Canadian cricketer
Peter Stead (writer) (born 1943), Welsh writer and broadcaster